John Cogal English (13 December 1886 – 21 January 1953) was an English footballer and manager who played for Hebburn Argyle, Preston, Watford and Sheffield United. He played as a left-back and was judged to be the finest in the League in 1915.

Club career
Born in Hebburn, County Durham, English started playing with Hebburn Argyle. He then went on to play for Preston and Watford, before being sold to Sheffield United for a fee of £500 in April 1913. He was a member of the Blades team who won the FA Cup final in 1915.

He left the Blades after refusing to re-sign following World War I and joined Darlington in 1919 as player-manager, retiring from playing in 1921 but remaining as manager for a further seven years. He went on to manage Nelson, before moving to Northampton Town, resigning from that post in March 1935. He later managed Exeter City.

International career
Jack English was selected to play for England against Wales in 1914 but his club would not release him.

References

External links

1886 births
1953 deaths
People from Hebburn
Footballers from Tyne and Wear
English footballers
England wartime international footballers
Association football fullbacks
English Football League players
English Football League managers
Hebburn Argyle F.C. players
Preston North End F.C. players
Watford F.C. players
Sheffield United F.C. players
Darlington F.C. players
Darlington F.C. managers
Northampton Town F.C. managers
Exeter City F.C. managers
Nelson F.C. managers
English Football League representative players
English football managers
FA Cup Final players